Soft Fruit is a 1999 comedy drama film about a dying mother and her children who come together to fulfill her last wishes. It is an Australian American co-production produced by New Zealand filmmaker Jane Campion and directed by Christina Andreef.

Plot

Four adult children reconvene in the steel-town of Port Kembla when their mother Patsy becomes terminally ill. The family includes sisters Josie, Nadia, and Vera, lone son Bo, and father Vic. It is the first time in eight years that all of the family has been under the same roof. Josie, herself a mother, is coming from San Diego in the U.S., while ex-con Bo is coming from prison. Nadia is having an affair with her ex-husband, and Vera is the shy one of the family.

Cast
Jeanie Drynan as Patsy
Russell Dykstra as Bo
Linal Haft as Vic
Genevieve Lemon as Josie
Sacha Horler as Nadia
Alicia Talbot as Vera

Production 
On the themes of the film, Andreef said:As you grow older, it's so difficult to stay in relationship with your adult brothers and sisters. When you get into your thirties and forties, paths are dividing.   Soft Fruit is about that sibling struggle. You think you don't care when you have a fight and fall out. Someone is always on the outer. It's about that struggle to get back on the inner, on the inside.

Box office
Soft Fruit grossed $598,704 at the box office in Australia.

Critical reception
On Rotten Tomatoes, Soft Fruit has an approval rating of 64% based on 14 reviews. The site’s consensus reads, "Critics say that while Soft Fruit might be difficult to watch -- dealing as it is with terminal illness -- it is an emotionally genuine, warm film. The ensemble cast are also praised for their excellent portrayals of a family."

A.O. Scott of The New York Times wrote, "Soft Fruit shares with Sweetie, Ms. Campion's 1989 study of domestic monstrosity, as well as with such provincial antipodal slice-of-life comic melodramas as Muriel's Wedding, a commitment to showing human beings as they are, which is often highly unpleasant." He added, "The general talent and dedication of the ensemble mitigate the script's occasional lapses into sentimentality and noisy confrontation…Soft Fruit belongs, however, to the divine Ms. Drynan, who plays a dying, unfulfilled, ordinary woman without embellishment or overstatement but with mischievous reserve and surprising sensuality. Patsy is simultaneously dying and coming alive for the first time."

Awards and nominations 
Australian Film Institute Awards 1999
Australian Film Institute Award for Best Actor - Russell Dykstra (winner)
Australian Film Institute Award for Best Supporting Actress - Sacha Horler (winner)
Australian Film Institute Award for Best Film (nominated)
Australian Film Institute Award for Best Actress - Jeanie Drynan (nominated)
Australian Film Institute Award for Best Director - Christina Andreef (nominated)
Australian Film Institute Award for Best Screenplay - Christina Andreef (nominated)
Australian Film Institute Award for Best Original Music Score – Antony Partos (nominated)

ARIA Music Award
Best Original Soundtrack Album (nominated)

See also
Cinema of Australia

References

External links

Soft Fruit at Oz Movies

Australian drama films
1999 films
1999 independent films
Fox Searchlight Pictures films
1990s English-language films
1990s Australian films